FreePCB is a printed circuit board design program for Microsoft Windows, written by Allan Wright.

Functionality 
The program allows for up to 16 copper layers, both metric and customary units, and export of designs in RS-274X Gerber format. Boards can be partially or fully autorouted with the FreeRouting autorouter by using the FpcROUTE Specctra DSN design file translator.

Other operating systems 
FreePCB can run under Linux by using Wine and on Macintosh computers using Parallels Desktop for Mac, Virtual Box, or Wine via MacPorts.

See also 

 Comparison of EDA software
 List of free electronics circuit simulators

References

External links 
 
 There is a wonderful development branch of the program on this site
 PCB Systems Design Community
 fpcconvert - a HPGL and G-code conversion tool for FreePCB

Windows software
Free electronic design automation software